The 2020  Campeonato de España de Resistencia is the eighth season of the Campeonato de España de Resistencia. It is the fifth season with the TCR class

Teams and drivers

GT

CER

Calendar and results
Bold indicates overall winner for each car class (GT and CER).

GT

CER

Championship standings

Scoring system

Drivers' championship

GT

CER

TCR

References

External links
 

Campeonato de Espana de Resistencia
Campeonato de Espana de Resistencia